Sohar International Airport , is an international airport situated in the wilayat of Sohar in Al Batinah Region of Oman. Sohar is a coastal city on the Gulf of Oman.

The runway length does not include  displaced thresholds on both ends.

Construction
The airport was built in three packages. Package 1 included site preparation, package 2 included the infrastructure works, and package 3 included construction of airport facilities. The construction of the airport cost 100 million rials to build. 
 
A temporary airport was opened on 18 November 2014  before the completion of the passenger terminal building. Sohar airport was opened by Dr Ahmed bin Mohammed bin Salim Al Futaisi, minister of Transport and Communications, as part of 44th National Day celebrations in November 2014, and Oman Air operated an inaugural flight to mark the official opening. International flights to and from Sohar Airport commenced on 9 July 2017, with Air Arabia service to Sharjah.

Airlines and destinations

See also
Transport in Oman
List of airports in Oman

References

External links
OpenStreetMap - Sohar
OurAirports - Sohar Airport
SkyVector - Suhar Airport

Airports in Oman